Veruca or Verruca may refer to:

 Plantar wart, also called a verruca
 Veruca Salt (character), a character in Charlie and the Chocolate Factory
 Veruca Salt (band), an alternative rock band named after the character
 Veruca (Buffy the Vampire Slayer), a recurring character
 Verruca gnome, an anthropomorphic personification in Hogfather